Youri Latortue (born 13 November 1967) is a Haitian politician who served as president of the Senate from January 13, 2017 to January 9, 2018. He was sanctioned by the Canadian and United States authorities for his involvement in the global illicit drug trade November 4, 2022.

A former member of the party Inite, he joined various right-wing parties. As leader of the right-wing coalition in the legislative elections of 2016, he won 29 seats in the Chamber of Deputies and 9 in the Senate. Having a senatorial majority, he was elected president of the Senate in January 2017 becoming the main opponent of the government.

Latortue is a first cousin once-removed of former prime minister Gérard Latortue.

In a secret US Embassy cable from 2006 released by Wikileaks, former US ambassador Janet Sanderson described Youri Latortue as "one of the most brazenly corrupt of leading Haitian politicians.” In other cables former US ambassador James Foley accused Latortue of being connected to drug traffickers and running "a network of dirty cops and gangs".

U.S. and Canadian Government Sanctions Against Latortue 
On November 4th 2022 the U.S. the U.S. Department of the Treasury’s Office of Foreign Assets Control and the Government of Canada imposed joint sanctions against Youri Latortue and President of the Haitian Senate Joseph Lambert. The sanctions targeting the former senator was a response to his allegedly involvement in "illegal activities of armed criminal gangs, including through money laundering and other acts of corruption" and having used his position to traffic drugs and collaborated with criminal and gang networks to undermine the rule of law in Haiti". The Office of Foreign Assets Control specifically mentioned Youri Latortue's lengthy involvement in the trafficking of cocaine from Colombia to Haiti.

References

1967 births
Members of the Senate (Haiti)
Presidents of the Senate (Haiti)
Living people